The 2010 Open Diputación Ciudad de Pozoblanco was a professional tennis tournament played on hard court. This was the eleventh edition of the tournament which is part of the Tretorn SERIE+ of the 2010 ATP Challenger Tour. It took place in Pozoblanco, Spain between 5 July and 11 July 2010.

ATP entrants

Seeds

 Rankings are as of June 21, 2010.

Other entrants
The following players received wildcards into the singles main draw:
  Agustín Boje-Ordóñez
  Pablo Carreño-Busta
  Gerard Granollers-Pujol
  Juan José Leal-Gómez

The following players received entry from the qualifying draw:
  George Bastl
  David Cañudas-Fernández
  Marc Fornell-Mestres (as a Lucky Loser)
  Pablo Martín-Adalia
  Nikolaus Moser

Champions

Singles

 Rubén Ramírez Hidalgo def.  Roberto Bautista-Agut, 7–6(6), 6–4

Doubles

 Marcel Granollers /  Gerard Granollers-Pujol def.  Brian Battistone /  Filip Prpic 6–4, 4–6 [10–4]

References
Official website
ITF Search